Pometia pinnata is a large tropical hardwood and fruit tree species, with common names including matoa, taun tree, island lychee, tava, Pacific lychee of the plant family Sapindaceae.

Naturally widespread, the trees are native to tropical South Asia, Southeast Asia, and Melanesia. It was transported during the Austronesian expansion to Polynesia during prehistoric times, evident by cognates of local names used on islands ranging from Sulawesi to Niue.

Description
It has pinnate leaves.

This popular fruit is slightly larger than a longan, but its flesh is less watery and its shell is thicker.

References

Sapindaceae
Flora of tropical Asia
Trees of Oceania